U.S. Life-Saving Station No. 35 is located in Stone Harbor, Cape May County, New Jersey, United States. The station was built in 1895 and added to the National Register of Historic Places on October 8, 2008.

See also
National Register of Historic Places listings in Cape May County, New Jersey

References

Shingle Style architecture in New Jersey
Government buildings completed in 1895
Buildings and structures in Cape May County, New Jersey
Government buildings on the National Register of Historic Places in New Jersey
Life-Saving Service stations
National Register of Historic Places in Cape May County, New Jersey
New Jersey Register of Historic Places
Life-Saving Service stations on the National Register of Historic Places
Stone Harbor, New Jersey